Oaklee Pendergast (born 24 June 2004) is an English actor. He is best known for his roles in The Impossible and The Woman in Black: Angel of Death.

Career 
Pendergast made his acting debut in 2008, appearing in an episode of EastEnders as Felix Stewart, Jamie Stewart's son. In 2012 he featured in two episodes of Casualty. That same year, he made his feature film debut, playing Simon Bennett in The Impossible, which was based on the true experiences of María Belón and her family during the 2004 Indian Ocean earthquake and tsunami.  In 2014, Pendergast landed another main role in the film, The Woman in Black: Angel of Death.

Since 2016 Pendergast has worked in a number of TV series—he appeared in all 6 episodes of Camping, in 4 episodes of Marcella, and is currently starring in Home. The latter, a sitcom, reunites Pendergast with actor Rufus Jones (who created and writes the series); they starred together in Camping.

Filmography

Films

Television

Awards and nominations

References

External links 

2004 births
Living people
21st-century English actors
21st-century English male actors
English film actors